Judith Ann Bunting (born 27 November 1960) is a television producer and politician who served as a Liberal Democrat Member of the European Parliament (MEP) for the South East England from 2019 to 2020. In 2014, she was chosen by the Royal Society of Chemistry to be one of their 175 Faces of Chemistry.

Education
Bunting attended Peterborough County Grammar School for Girls, then Fitzwilliam College, Cambridge, where she obtained a Master's Degree in Natural Sciences (Chemistry) in 1979. Her father taught Mechanical Engineering at Peterborough Regional College.

Career

Television 
Bunting has been a producer of educational and science-based documentary television since the 1990s. Her early producing credits include the BBC series Tomorrow's World, Teen Species, Horizon and Robert Winstons The Secret Life of Twins and Superhuman.

She produced three series of the series Body Hits and the RTS Award-winning Breast Cancer - the Operation for BBC3.

In 2007, she was series producer for the BBC Wales series, The Museum. She followed this by executive producing Rocket Science for BBC2 and Headshrinkers of the Amazon for the National Geographic Channel. Her 2009 documentary for the National Geographic Channel, The Neanderthal Code was nominated for a Grierson Award for Best Science Documentary.

Since 2013, Bunting has been series producer for production company Remark! on over 30 episodes of Magic Hands, a programme for CBeebies featuring poetry and Shakespeare for children translated entirely into British Sign Language, in which the presenters are all profoundly deaf.

Politics 
Since 2012, Bunting has increasingly focused on politics. In the 2015 and 2017 UK General Elections, she stood as the Liberal Democrat candidate for Newbury and both times came a distant second behind Richard Benyon. She has consistently pursued a broader engagement with science in politics and education. In September 2017, Bunting ruled out a third run as the Liberal Democrat parliamentary candidate for Newbury to "focus on her career as a television producer".

Bunting was elected as a Liberal Democrat MEP for the South East England in the 2019 European Elections. She was the Liberal Democrat Spokesperson on Education and Culture in Europe, and also sat on the Industry, Research and Energy committee.

Personal life
She lives in Newbury, Berkshire.

References 

Living people
1960 births
Alumni of Fitzwilliam College, Cambridge
British television producers
BBC television producers
British women television producers
Horizon (British TV series)
Liberal Democrats (UK) parliamentary candidates
Liberal Democrats (UK) MEPs
MEPs for England 2019–2020
People from Newbury, Berkshire
People from Peterborough
21st-century women MEPs for England